The Row is a luxury fashion label established by Mary-Kate and Ashley Olsen in 2006.

History

The idea for the brand started as a personal project in 2005 when Ashley Olsen challenged herself to create a perfect T-shirt. She tested the design on a variety of women of all body shapes and ages in an attempt to find a "commonality in fit and attitude".

By 2006, the sisters had created a 7-piece collection that included the T-shirt, a pair of cotton sateen leggings, and a cashmere wool tank dress. Barneys New York bought the entire first collection. The brand has expanded to include ready-to-wear, resort, handbags, sunglasses, and shoes. The brand is named after Savile Row in London.

Initially, the Olsens did not want their names attached to the brand and preferred to let the clothes speak for themselves. They did not give an interview about The Row for the first three years after its inception.

In 2008, Lauren Hutton modeled for the brand's first look book. Hutton explained: "... I saw the clothes, and they were wonderful, real simple, minimalist designs ... Ash had a place on the beach, so we did it at her place ... And they would dance on the deck, and I would do what they were doing. And it was good." Hutton accompanied the Olsens to the Council of Fashion Designers of America's annual awards show in 2012, the year they won their first Womenswear Designer of the Year award.

The Olsens work primarily out of The Row's TriBeCa studio at 609 Greenwich Street, New York, USA, which they have occupied since 2012, though a Paris office was opened in 2011 and a London office recently being opened in 2019.

In 2014, The Row opened its first store in Los Angeles. The brand's second flagship store opened in New York in May 2016 with the brand's Pre-Fall 2016 collection.

The Row first created a menswear collection for Spring 2011, and in October 2016 the label launched a new collection of menswear at their Los Angeles and New York stores, with the intention to continue expanding the offerings.

In August 2018, The Row announced a complete menswear collection that included suiting, denim, and knits. The Olsens conducted two years of research prior to launching the collection, which became available in stores in October 2018.

In July 2020, it was reported The Row was weathering financial difficulties and had laid off half of its staff, stemming from the COVID-19 pandemic and the bankruptcy of Barneys New York, one of its largest accounts.

In September 2021, it was announced that The Row had launched its first children's collection.

The Cut estimated that The Row reached $100 million in sales per year.

Marketing

The brand's collections are regularly presented at New York Fashion Week and have been presented twice at Paris Fashion Week. The Spring 2016 collection was shown at the Château de Courances.

Retail locations
The Row is currently available in 164 stores in 37 countries.

In 2014, The Row opened its first store in Los Angeles. The Los Angeles location won an American Architecture Award from The Chicago Athenaeum in 2016. The brand's second flagship store opened in New York in May 2016 with the brand's Pre-Fall 2016 collection. A London store opened in 2019.

Collaborations
In 2011, The Row collaborated with TOMS Shoes for a limited-edition collection for the latter brand's one-for-one model. Afterward, the Olsens accompanied TOMS on a shoe drop in Honduras.

In 2012, The Row teamed up with Damien Hirst to create a line of luxury backpacks. The collection featured The Row's signature crocodile backpack in 12 different designs by Hirst. A portion of the proceeds of each sale went to UNICEF.

In 2015, The Row collaborated with Oliver Peoples on an eyewear collection, which included both optical frames and sunglasses. In 2018, The Row collaborated with Oliver Peoples on a second eyewear collection. The collection was inspired by the 1990s.

In February 2018, The Row collaborated with the Noguchi Museum for their Fall 2018 show at New York Fashion Week. The Olsens filled their showroom with sculptures by the artist, and their models walked among them. In September 2018, The Row again collaborated with the Noguchi Museum for an installation at the Dover Street Market in New York. The installation included a selection of looks from the brand's Fall 2018 collection, two sculptures by Isamu Noguchi, and three Akari light sculpture panels.

Awards

References

External Links
The Row

2006 establishments in New York City
Clothing brands of the United States
Companies based in New York City
Clothing companies established in 2006
Retail companies established in 2014
Fashion accessory brands
High fashion brands
Luxury brands